Spilomela pantheralis is a moth in the family Crambidae. It is found in Colombia, Brazil, Ecuador, Panama and Costa Rica.

References

Moths described in 1832
Spilomelinae